Colégio de São Bento is a Benedictine school for boys in Rio de Janeiro, Brazil with a history that dates back more than 150 years. It was founded in 1858 on the hills overlooking Rio de Janeiro's harbor and the Guanabara Bay, by the adjacent Benedictine monastery. Although the school is still run by the monastery, students who attend it may come from any denomination or religion.

All students follow a broad course of study, which includes Theology, Music, Algebra, Geometry, Physics, Chemistry, Biology, Classic Culture, Brazilian and Portuguese Literature, Geography, History, Portuguese, Spanish, French, and English Languages, Philosophy, Sociology, as well the History of Music, Architecture and Fine Arts, among other subjects.

The school has been consistently rated the best Brazilian high school by ENEM (National High School Assessment Test), showing the highest ranking of college admissions in the country. Its graduates, who refer to themselves as Benedictines include Brazilian leaders from government and business, renowned doctors, educators, poets, musicians and writers.

External links
www.csbrj.org.br
www.osb.org.br

Secondary schools in Brazil
Boys' schools in Brazil